Kalpasutra may refer to:

 Kalpa (Vedanga)
 Kalpa Sūtra